Puddling is both the material and the process of lining a water body such as a channel or pond with puddle clay (puddle, puddling) – a watertight (low hydraulic conductivity) material based on clay and water mixed to be workable.

Puddle clay as a lining
Puddling is used in maintaining canals or reservoirs on permeable ground. The technique of puddling and its use was developed by early canal engineer James Brindley; it is considered his greatest contribution to engineering. This processed material was used extensively in UK canal construction in the period starting circa 1780. Starting about 1840 puddle clay was used more widely as the water-retaining element (or core) within earthfill dams, particularly in the Pennines. Its usage in UK dams was superseded about 1960 by the use of rolled clay in the core, and better control of moisture content.

A considerable number of early notable dams were built in that era and they are now sometimes referred to as the 'Pennines embankment' type.  These dams are characterized by a slender vertical puddle clay core supported on both sides by earthfill shoulders of more heterogeneous material.  To control under-seepage through the natural foundation below the dam, the Pennines embankments generally constructed a puddle clay-filled cutoff trench in rock directly below the central core.  Later construction often used concrete to fill the cutoff trench.

To make puddle, clay or heavy loam is chopped with a spade and mixed into a plastic state with water and sometimes coarse sand or grit to discourage excavation by moles or water voles. Puddle has to be kept wet in order to remain waterproof so it is important for canals to be kept filled with water.

Puddle as a building material
Puddle clay or puddle adobe is often called cob. Cob has added ingredients of a fibrous material to act as a mechanical binder.

See also

Canals of the United Kingdom
History of the British canal system

Notes

External links
Canal and River Trust - Specification of Clay

References
Waterways in the Making, Edward Paget-Tomlinson, The Landscape Press, 1996, 
The Illustrated History of Canal and River Navigations, Edward Paget-Tomlinson, Landmark Publishing Ltd., 2006, 

Water transport infrastructure
Soil-based building materials